José Rodolfo Devers (born December 7, 1999) is a Dominican professional baseball shortstop in the Miami Marlins organization.

Career

New York Yankees
Devers was signed as an international free agent by the New York Yankees in 2016. He made his professional debut in 2017, playing for both the Dominican Summer League Yankees and the Gulf Coast League Yankees, posting a combined .245 batting average with one home run, 16 RBIs and 16 stolen bases in 53 games between both teams.

Miami Marlins
On December 11, 2017, Devers was traded to the Miami Marlins (along with Starlin Castro and Jorge Guzmán) in exchange for outfielder Giancarlo Stanton and cash considerations. He spent 2018 with the Greensboro Grasshoppers, batting .273 with 24 RBIs in 85 games. He also played in two games for the Jupiter Hammerheads during the season. Devers returned to Jupiter to begin 2019, but missed time due to injury; over 33 games, he batted .325. He was selected to play in the Arizona Fall League for the Salt River Rafters following the season.

On November 20, 2020, Devers was added to the 40-man roster. On April 22, 2021, Devers was promoted to the major leagues for the first time. He made his MLB debut on April 24 against the San Francisco Giants as the starting second baseman.

On June 14, Devers was placed on the injured list with a right shoulder impingement. He was transferred to the 60-day injured list on July 20. On August 11, Devers underwent season-ending surgery to repair a labrum tear in his right shoulder.

On November 15, 2022, Devers was designated for assignment. Devers was outrighted to the minors on November 20, 2022.

Personal life
Devers' cousin, Rafael Devers, reached MLB with the Boston Red Sox in 2017. In May 2021 the Marlins visited the Red Sox at Fenway Park for a three game series. In this series Jose played against Rafael, and the two exchanged interactions throughout the series.

External links

External links

Living people
1999 births
Major League Baseball players from the Dominican Republic
Major League Baseball infielders
Miami Marlins players
Dominican Summer League Yankees players
Gulf Coast Yankees players
Greensboro Grasshoppers players
Jupiter Hammerheads players
Gulf Coast Marlins players
Clinton LumberKings players
Salt River Rafters players
Jacksonville Jumbo Shrimp players